The Mexican National Light Heavyweight Championship (Campeonato Nacional Semicompleto in Spanish) is a national Mexican singles professional wrestling championship sanctioned by the Comisión de Box y Lucha Libre Mexico D.F. (Mexico City Boxing and Wrestling Commission). Since its creation in 1942, the championship has not been promoted by one specific promotion throughout its existence, but shared between many Mexican promotions. Among others, Empresa Mexicana de Lucha Libre (EMLL), Asistencia Asesoría y Administración (AAA), the ENSEMA promotion and the Independent circuit but since December 2007 Consejo Mundial de Lucha Libre (CMLL) has had the exclusive rights to the championship. Championship matches normally take place under best two-out-of-three falls rules.

Jesus Anaya became the first National Light Heavyweight Champion when he won the inaugural tournament that concluded on the EMLL 9th Anniversary Show, defeating Black Guzmán. Empresa Mexicana de Luch Libre was the primary promotion to use the championship in subsequent years, although did not have exclusive control of the championship. In 1992 then-CMLL booker Antonio Peña left the company to create AAA and brought a number of CMLL wrestlers with him, including among others the then-reigning Mexican National Light Heavyweight Champion Máscara Sagrada. The commission allowed Máscara Sagrada to take the championship with him to AAA. From AAA's creation in 1992 until 2002 they had exclusive control of the championship, In 2002 El Dandy won the title, transitioning the championship to the ENSEMA promotion. In December 2007 Místico won the title from Vangelis, making it an official CMLL recognized championship from that point forward.

The current champion is Ángel de Oro, having defeated Felino for the championship on June 29, 2021. He is the 68th overall champion and this is his first title reign. La Parka / L.A. Park and Pierroth Jr. are tied for most title reigns, with four reigns; Pierroth Jr. has the shortest reign at no more than 11 days. El Dandy's two reigns combine to 1,526 days, the most days for any champion, while the longest continuous reign belongs to Cavernario Galindo, with 1,249 days.

Title history
Key

Combined reigns 

Key

Notes

References
General sources
[G1] - 
Specific

External links
  Mexican National Light Heavyweight Championship

Light heavyweight wrestling championships
Mexican national wrestling championships
National professional wrestling championships